Oleksandr Yakovych Konysky (August 18, 1836 – December 12, 1900) was a Ukrainian interpreter, writer, lexicographer, pedagogue, poet, and civil activist of liberal direction. He had around 150 pen names, including О. Return-freedom, F. Gorovenko, V. Burkun, Perebendia, and О. Khutorianyn. 

By profession he was a lawyer and is known as the author of the text of the Ukrainian spiritual anthem "Prayer for Ukraine".

Early life 
Konysky was born in the village of Perekhodivka, today in the district of Nizhyn, in the Chernihiv Oblast. He was of the old heritage of the medieval Principality of Chernigov. The future writer grew up in the city of Nizhyn, about which he wrote: "Nizhyn is a small city. At the same time it was the center of enlightenment of the Chernihiv lands and the north of the Poltava lands. Here was located the Bezborodko Lyceum. Nizhyn has also had a glorious historic past, especially in trade, so among its people many have been distinguished".

Career
Konysky’s first publication was in the Chernigovsky Listok in 1858. In Poltava and Kyiv he formed Sunday schools and wrote textbooks for them. Konysky was also the author of several church articles in local newspapers and was an active member of the Kyivan Hromada. As a member of the Kyiv City Council, he worked to introduce the Ukrainian language into the city's schools. Among his books and textbooks were Ukrainian writing ( 1862), Arithmetic, or Reckoning (1863), and Grammar or first reading for early students ( 1882).

Konysky also had links with the Ukrainian activists of Halychyna, which led to his being accused of being a Little-Russian propaganda activist. In 1863 he was sent to Vologda, without receiving a trial. In 1871, his novel Don't give gold, don't beat with a hammer was confiscated and destroyed by the local police. From 1865 Konysky lived beyond the borders of the Russian Empire and came into closer contact with the Ukrainian activists of Halychyna. In 1872, after being released from police supervision, he returned to Kyiv, where he worked for the Kievskiy Telegraf. Konysky was one of the founders of the Shevchenko Scientific Society in Lviv in 1873 and later initiated its transformation into a society without commercial activity.

In 1887, together with Volodymyr Antonovych, and influenced by the Brotherhood of Tarasovs as a member of the Stara Hromada, Konysky led the creation of the All-Ukrainian Public Organization, a civil-political fellowship with the aim of uniting all circles of nationally conscious Ukrainians. As the organization's publication source he founded the publishing firm Vik, which existed for fifteen years and released over 100 books in Ukrainian. 

Konysky died in Kyiv in December 1900.

References
 Orthodoxy in Ukraine

See also
 Prayer for Ukraine

1836 births
1900 deaths
People from Chernihiv Oblast
People from Nezhinsky Uyezd
Ukrainian people in the Russian Empire
Ukrainian nobility
Ukrainian educators
Ukrainian poets
Ukrainian public relations people
Ukrainian lexicographers
Ukrainian language activists
Members of the Shevchenko Scientific Society
Hromada (society) members
Educators from the Russian Empire
Poets from the Russian Empire
Male writers from the Russian Empire
Lawyers from the Russian Empire
Ukrainian novelists
Ukrainian publishers (people)
Burials at Baikove Cemetery
19th-century lexicographers